Nahavand is a city in Hamadan Province, Iran. It is the capital of Nahavand County. At the time of the 2006 census, its population was 72,218, in 19,419 families. It is located south of the city of Hamadan, west of Malayer and northwest of Borujerd. Inhabited continuously since prehistoric times, Nahavand was bestowed upon the House of Karen in the Sasanian period. During the Muslim conquest of Persia, it was the site of the famous Battle of Nahavand.

Name 
The name Nahāvand is probably ultimately derived from Old Persian *Niθāvanta-, related to the Old Persian name Nisāya, itself derived from the prefix ni-, meaning "down" and a second element which is related to Avestan si or say, meaning "to lie down".

It has been spelled differently in different books and sources: Nahavand, Nahavend, Nahawand, Nahaavand, Nihavand, Nehavand, Nihavend, or Nehavend, formerly called Mah-Nahavand, and in antiquity Laodicea (Arabic Ladhiqiyya), also transliterated Laodiceia and Laodikeia, Laodicea in Media, Laodicea in Persis, Antiochia in Persis, Antiochia of Chosroes, Antiochia in Media, Nemavand and Niphaunda.

Geography
Nahavand is situated in the west of Iran, in the northern part of the Zagros region. It lies  kilometers south of Hamadan, from which it is separated by the massif of the Alvand subrange. This massif grants Nahavand and its hinterlands an abundant water supply. Historically, Nahavand was located on a route that led from central Iraq through Kermanshah to northern Iran, and was therefore often crossed by armies. Another historic road, coming from Kermanshah, leads towards Isfahan in central Iran and avoids the Alvand massif. Nahavand also lies on the branch of the Gamasab river which comes from the southeast from the vicinity of Borujerd; from Nahavand the Gamasab river flows westwards to Mount Behistun. Given Nahavand's location, it was the site of several battles, and was considered important in Iranian history during Iran's wars with its western neighbors.

Climate
Nahavand has a dry summer humid continental climate (Köppen climate classification Dsa).

Prehistory
Excavations conducted in 1931/2 at Tepe Giyan by Georges Contenau and Roman Ghirshman led to the conclusion that Nahavand and its environs have been inhabited since prehistoric times. It showed that the site of Tepe Giyan, which lies  kilometers southeast of Nahavand, was occupied from at least 5,000 BC to  BC.

History

During the Achaemenid period (550–330 BC), Nahavand was located in the southernmost part of Media, on the fertile Nisaean plain. The ancient geographer and historian Strabo wrote that it was "(re-)founded" by Achaemenid King Xerxes the Great (486–465 BC). It lay  kilometers from Ecbatana (modern-day Hamadan), on the trunk road from Babylonia through Media to Bactria. In the Seleucid period, Nahavand was turned into a Greek polis with magistrates and a Seleucid governor. In the 20th century, a stone stele was found near Nahavand. The stele bore a copy of the dynastic cult inscription of Seleucid ruler Antiochus III the Great (222–187 BC), which he had created for his wife Queen Laodice III. The stele, dated to 193 BC, revealed the terminus ante quem of the foundation of the Greek polis Laodiceia. According to the polymath Abu Hanifa Dinawari, who flourished in the 9th century, in the Parthian period, Nahavand was the seat of the Parthian prince Artabanus, who later reigned as Artabanus I of Parthia (127-124/3 BC). During the Sasanian period, the district of Nahavand was bestowed upon the House of Karen. There was also a fire temple.

In 642, during the Arab conquest of Iran, a famous battle was fought at Nahavand. With heavy losses on both sides, it eventually resulted in a Sasanian defeat, and as such, opened up the doors of the Iranian plateau to the invaders. In the early Islamic period, Nahavand flourished as part of the province of Jibal. It first functioned as administrative center of the Mah al-Basra ("Media of the Basrans") district. Its revenues were reportedly used for the payment of the troops from Basra that were stationed in Nahavand. Medieval geographers mention Nahavand as an affluent commercial hub with two Friday mosques. When the 10th century Arab traveller Abu Dulaf travelled through Nahavand he noted "fine remains of the [ancient] Persians". Abu Dulaf also wrote that during the reign of Caliph al-Ma'mun (813–833), a treasure chamber had been found, containing two gold caskets.

In the course of the subsequent centuries, only few events in Nahavand were recorded. The Persian vizier of the Seljuk Empire, Nizam al-Mulk, was assassinated in 1092 near Nahavand. According to the historian and geographer Hamdallah Mustawfi, who flourished in the 13th and 14th centuries, Nahavand was a town of medium size surrounded by fertile fields where corn, cotton and fruits were grown. Mustawfi added that its inhabitants were mainly Twelver Shia Kurds.

In 1589, during the Ottoman-Safavid War of 1578-1590, Ottoman General Cığalazade Yusuf Sinan Pasha built a fortress at Nahavand for future campaigns against Safavid Iran. By the Treaty of Constantinople (1590), the Safavids were forced to cede the city to the Turks. In 1602/3, Nahavand's citizens revolted against the Ottoman occupiers. Coinciding with the Celali revolts in Anatolia, the Safavids recaptured Nahavand and expelled the Ottomans from the city, thus restoring Iranian control. The Safavid governor of Hamadan, Hasan Khan Ustajlu, subsequently destroyed the Ottoman fort. In the wake of the collapse of the Safavids in 1722, the Turks captured Nahavand once more. In 1730, they were ousted by Nader-Qoli Beg (later known as Nader Shah; 1736–1747). Nader's death in 1747 led to instability. Over the next few years, Nahavand was exploited by local Bakhtiari chiefs. In , Karim Khan Zand defeated the Bakhtiari chieftain Ali Mardan Khan Bakhtiari at Nahavand.

Music 
Nahavand also gives its name to the musical mode (maqam) Nahawand in Arabic, Persian and Turkish music. This mode is known for its wide variety of Western sounding melodies.

Languages 

The local language of the city is the Nahavandi sub-dialect of the northern dialect of the Luri language. This dialect is one of the closest dialects to the Middle Persian language, and is occasionally considered a distinct language.

Southern Kurdish is also spoken in Nahavand.

Notable figures 
 Abu Lu'lu'a Firuz (d. 644, Nahavandi origin uncertain), craftsman and slave who killed the second caliph Umar
 Benjamin Nahawandi, a key figure in the development of Karaite Judaism in the early Middle Ages
 Ahmad Nahavandi, 8th-century astronomer who worked at the Academy of Gundishapur.

References

Sources

External links 

 Hamedan Province Cultural Heritage Website
 Persian History Website
 Smith, William (editor); Dictionary of Greek and Roman Geography, "Laodiceia", London, (1854)
 
 

Populated places in Nahavand County
Cities in Hamadan Province
Achaemenid cities
Seleucid colonies
Parthian cities
Sasanian cities